The individual all-around is an artistic gymnastics event held at the Summer Olympics. The event was first held for men at the second modern Olympics in 1900, and has been held every Games since. The women's competition was added in 1952.

Medalists

Men

Multiple medalists

Medalists by country

Women

Multiple medalists

Medalists by country

References

Individual all-around
Olympics